The War Next Door is an American sitcom created by Will McRobb and Chris Viscardi. The show used non-canon humor as one of the two main characters dies at the end of each episode, only to reappear alive the following episode as if nothing had happened. The show ran for only 8 out of 13 episodes and was broadcast on USA Network from July 23 until September 24, 2000.

Summary 
Kennedy Smith, a super secret agent, just wants to retire. Unfortunately, his seemingly indestructible nemesis, Kriegman, wants to make his life hell and so moves into the suburbs and becomes Smith's next-door neighbor and evil opponent.

Characters and actors 
 Linden Ashby as Kennedy Smith
 Damian Young as Allan Kriegman
 Susan Walters as Lili Smith
 Tara Rosling as Barbara Bush
 Nicole Dicker as Ellis Smith
 Mark Rendall as Lucas Smith

Episodes

External links
 

Television series created by Will McRobb and Chris Viscardi
2000s American single-camera sitcoms
2000 American television series debuts
2000 American television series endings
English-language television shows
USA Network original programming